WQLN-FM (91.3 FM, "Q-91.3 FM") is a National Public Radio member station that serves the Erie, Pennsylvania, area of the United States. WQLN's studios and transmitter are located in Summit Township, south of the Erie city limits (but with an Erie mailing address), just slightly northeast of the shared studios of ABC affiliate WJET-TV (Channel 24) and Fox affiliate WFXP (Channel 66) off Peach Street.

Repeaters
WQLN-FM also broadcasts from the following five translators:

See also
 WQLN (TV)

External links
WQLN website

QLN
NPR member stations